Naina Jaiswal (born on 22 March 2000) is an Indian table tennis player who won multiple titles in both national and international championships. She is also a "Child Prodigy star" who started pursuing PhD at the age of 17.

Early life
Born in Hyderabad to Ashwani Kumar Jaiswal and Bhagya Laxmi Jaiswal, Naina had completed her graduation at the age of 13 from St. Mary's College, Hyderabad. At the age of 15 she has completed her master's degree and at the age of 17 she began a PhD.

Education
Naina Jaiswal completed her 10th grade at the age of 8, completed her Intermediate at the age of 10, completed her Graduate degree from St. Mary's College at the age of 13, completed her Post graduation from Osmania University at the age of 15 and currently she is pursuing her PhD. She is the youngest post-graduate from Asia.

International titles

First girl from India who selected for ITTF World Hopes Team – 2011 
Secured 6th position in the world (Austria) – 2011 (under-12)
Cadet girls' team gold medalist in Indian open – 2011
Cadet girls' singles bronze medalist in Indian open – 2011
Cadet girls' team bronze medalist in Indian open – 2013
Cadet girls' double bronze medalist in Indian open – 2013
Cadet girls' team gold medalist in Fajr cup (Iran) 2013
Cadet girls' doubles gold medalist in Fajr cup (Iran) 2013
Cadet girls' singles bronze medalist in Fajr cup (Iran) 2013
Participated in Hong Kong junior and cadet open 2011
Participated in Asian junior championship (2011)

National titles

Present ranking – India's no. 1 (under 15)
Cadet girls' singles National champion (gold medalist) 2010
Cadet girls' team National champion (gold medalist) 2010
Sub- junior girls team National champion (gold medalist) 2010, 2011, and 2012 
Junior girls' team National champion (gold medalist) 2010
Sub-junior singles (bronze medalist) 2010
Sub-junior doubles (silver medalist) 2011
Youth girls' team (bronze medalist) 2011
Junior girls' team (bronze medalist) 2012
Youth girls' team (silver medalist) 2012
Junior girls' doubles (silver medalist) 2012
Sub-junior girls' team (bronze medalist) 2013
Sub- junior girls' doubles (silver medalist) 2013
Hat-trick winner of first national ranking tournaments (2011, 2012, 2013)

References

2000 births
Indian female table tennis players
Sportswomen from Hyderabad, India
Living people
Racket sportspeople from Hyderabad, Indiahbvf